Rachel Anne Zegler (born May 3, 2001) is an American actress and singer. She made her film debut playing Maria Vasquez in the 2021 musical drama West Side Story, for which she won the Golden Globe Award for Best Actress – Motion Picture Comedy or Musical. She is the first actress of Colombian descent to win the award and, at 20 years old, its youngest recipient.

Early life 
Zegler was born in Hackensack, New Jersey in 2001 to parents Gina and Craig Zegler. She was named after the fictional character Rachel Green from the TV show Friends. She has an older sister. Her mother is of Colombian descent. Zegler's maternal grandmother immigrated from Colombia to the United States in the 1960s. Her father is of Polish descent.

Zegler was born in Hackensack and raised in Clifton, New Jersey, where she attended St. Philip the Apostle Preparatory School. She then attended the Catholic all-girls college-preparatory Immaculate Conception High School. She graduated from high school on June 2, 2019.

Career 
Zegler began her career starring in several musicals while attending the Immaculate Conception High School, including playing Belle in Beauty and the Beast (2016), Ariel in The Little Mermaid (2017), Dorothy Brock in 42nd Street (2018), and Princess Fiona in Shrek the Musical (2019). For all four performances, she received Metro Award nominations in the Actress in a Leading Role category. Her other roles include Serena in Legally Blonde, Cosette in Les Misérables, and Millie in Thoroughly Modern Millie.

Zegler's YouTube channel has been active since July 2015 and has received attention. As of 2022, Zegler's video of herself singing "Shallow", from A Star Is Born, has garnered over 12.2 million views on Twitter.

In January 2018, director Steven Spielberg posted an open casting call via Twitter for a new film adaptation of West Side Story. Zegler, then 16 years old, responded to the casting call tweets with videos of herself singing "Tonight" and "I Feel Pretty"; she had performed the role at the Bergen Performing Arts Center in 2017. Zegler was selected from over 30,000 applicants for the role of Maria, marking her film debut. The film was released in December 2021, and earned acclaim from critics and audiences. For her performance, she received a Critics' Choice Movie Award nomination for Best Young Performer and won the Golden Globe Award for Best Actress – Motion Picture Comedy or Musical, making her the first actress of Colombian descent to win in that category as well as the youngest winner in that category at 20 years old.

Zegler stars as Anthea in the superhero film Shazam! Fury of the Gods (2023)

Upcoming projects 
Zegler will play Snow White alongside Gal Gadot as the Evil Queen in a live-action film adaptation of the 1937 animated Disney film. Zegler will voice the lead character in animated musical film Spellbound (2023), directed by Vicky Jenson. She plays heroine Lucy Gray Baird for the upcoming film adaptation of the Hunger Games prequel The Hunger Games: The Ballad of Songbirds and Snakes.

In the media 
On September 27, 2021, Zegler was listed at number 34 on The Ringers The Big Picture podcast's list of the top 35 actors under 35. She is included in the Forbes 30 Under 30 class of 2022 list. On December 14, 2021, AP Entertainment named Zegler as one of the Breakthrough Entertainers of 2021. Zegler was part of the in memoriam segment of the 64th Annual Grammy Awards in honour of Stephen Sondheim, alongside Ben Platt, Cynthia Erivo, and Leslie Odom Jr.

On March 20, 2022, it was revealed by Zegler that she was not invited to attend the 94th Academy Awards ceremony to support her colleagues involved with West Side Story, which received seven nominations, including Best Picture. She wrote in a comment on one of her Instagram posts: "I have tried it all but it doesn't seem to be happening ... I will root for West Side Story from my couch and be proud of the work we so tirelessly did 3 years ago. I hope some last minute miracle occurs and I can celebrate with our film in person." Entertainment Weekly noted that the studios behind the nominated films are the ones who determine the ticket allotments for those involved with the Best Picture nominees with the exception of nominees for other categories and ceremony presenters. This was followed by a response from Russ Tamblyn, who played Riff in the 1961 film adaptation, saying, "As a voting member and the original Riff, let me say: it's your duty to find Rachel a seat at the Oscars ... When they say representation matters, this is what that means. Please do right by her." The following day, the Academy invited her to be a presenter, with her shooting schedule for Disney's Snow White being reconfigured to allow Zegler to travel from London to Los Angeles to attend the ceremony. Zegler with Jacob Elordi presented the Academy Award for Best Visual Effects.

She was included on Forbes' "30 Under 30" list in 2022.

Acting credits

Film

Television

Discography

Soundtracks

Singles

Other appearances

Awards and nominations

References

External links 
 
 

Living people
21st-century American actresses
American film actresses
21st-century American women singers
American people of Colombian descent
American people of Polish descent
Hispanic and Latino American actresses
Actresses from New Jersey
American pop musicians
American women pop singers
Best Musical or Comedy Actress Golden Globe (film) winners
American YouTubers
Music YouTubers
People from Clifton, New Jersey
Actors from Hackensack, New Jersey
21st-century American singers
Singers from New Jersey
2001 births